The Gilded Man (also published as Death and the Gilded Man) is a mystery novel by the American writer John Dickson Carr, who published it under the name of Carter Dickson.  It is a whodunnit and features the series detective Sir Henry Merrivale.

Plot summary

Wealthy art connoisseur Dwight Stanhope, his glamorous wife Christabel and his pretty daughters, sensible Betty and neurotic Eleanor, have invited a couple of guests to their mansion "Waldemere"; Vincent James, the "weekend perennial -- charming and a bit thick" and Nick Wood, an attractive young man about whom little is known.

What is odd is that Dwight Stanhope's valuable paintings, including a Rembrandt, have been moved from the burglarproof gallery to the main floor, and their insurance policy has been cancelled.  Everyone in the mansion (built by Flavia Jenner, a Victorian actress of easy virtue, and including her own private theatre) has the jitters.  No one is really surprised when there's a huge clatter in the middle of the night and a masked burglar is found stabbed in front of the paintings—but everyone is amazed to see that the dead burglar is Dwight Stanhope.

Sir Henry Merrivale arrives and suspicious events begin to happen thick and fast; he mixes investigation with an uproarious performance as a stage magician at a children's show and solves the crime.

1942 American novels
Novels by John Dickson Carr
William Morrow and Company books